Franciscus van Hombeeck (1885–1907) is a Belgian politician. Van Hombeeck was mayor of the Flemish town of Berchem, near Antwerp. During his political mandate, Berchem became a prosperous and wealthy community. One of Berchem's main squares is named after him.

1885 births
1907 deaths
People from Berchem